The ANT-8 was an experimental flying boat designed by Tupolev. It was designated the "MDR-2" (MDR meaning Morskoi Dalnii Razvedchik, or Naval Long-Range Reconnaissance) by the military.

Design and development
Tupolev and the TsAGI were asked to build the ANT-8 in 1925, but other projects were deemed more important. Thus, little was completed on the ANT-8. Finally, in 1930, with Ivan Pogosski leading, actual work was started on the aircraft. Its first flight was on January 30, 1931, piloted by S. Riballschuk. Shortly after the ANT-8 flew for the first time, the ANT-14 lifted off the ground.

Construction
The ANT-8 was chosen to be made entirely from metal, with a Duralumin hull and similar wings to the Tupolev R-6. The fuselage received much attention from the designers and it was decided to have the floats included in the load-bearing structure. Power came from two pusher BMW VI engines mounted over the wings. The aircraft was fitted with an enclosed cockpit for the two pilots, while turrets were mounted in the bow and aft of the wing, each mounting two DA-2 machine guns. Up to 500 kg (1,102 lb) of bombs could be carried under the wing roots.

Although the aircraft demonstrated excellent seaworthiness, and Tupolev learned much about flying boat hulls from it, continuation of the ANT-8 project was deemed unnecessary by the Soviet Navy, as it was believed that it was obsolete and would soon be superseded by the Chetverikov MDR-3. Only one was built, although its hull was modified several times.

Operators

Tupolev factory.

Specifications (MDR-2)

References

Bibliography

 Duffy, Paul and Andrei Kandalov. (1996) Tupolev, The Man and His Aircraft. Warrendale, PA: Society of Automotive Engineers.
 Gunston, Bill. The Osprey Encyclopedia of Russian Aircraft 1975–1995. London: Osprey, 1995. .

ANT-08
1930s Soviet patrol aircraft
Flying boats
Twin-engined pusher aircraft
High-wing aircraft
Aircraft first flown in 1931